Statutory holiday may refer to: 
Public holidays in Canada
Public holidays in New Zealand
Public holidays in Australia
Public holidays in the United Kingdom

See also
 :Category:Lists of public holidays by country